Dominic Were Makawiti (4 August 1955 – 20 April 2018)  was a Kenyan biochemist. He served as Vice Chancellor of Maseno University and was an elected fellow and former treasurer of the African Academy of Sciences.

Biography 
Dominic Were Makawati was born to Paul Awiti Odongo and Sulema Owuor Awiti on August 4, 1956 in Kisumu, Nyanza, Kenya. He attended Nyabondo Secondary School until 1970. He obtained a diploma in education degree from Kenya Science Teachers College, Nairobi (1976) and a bachelor of science degree in biochemistry and chemistry from the University of Nairobi (1979). He received his doctorate degree in reproductive biochemistry from the King's College School of Medicine and Dentistry at the University of London (1984).

Career 
Makawati started his career as a graduate assistant at   the reproductive Biology Unit, Department of Animal Physiology, University of Nairobi (1980). He became research assistant (1985), a lecturer (1986), a senior lecturer (1989), an associate professor (1992). In the same year, he became the Chairman of the Department of Biochemistry . He was appointed as an associate Dean of Pre-Clinical Departments, College of Health Science in 1994. Following his full professorship in  1998, he was appointed as the Dean of School of Medicine in 2002.

Honors and awards 
Makawiti received the following honors:
 In 2006, he received the  Head of State Commendation (HSC) award by the president of Kenya

 He was the Founder, and Treasurer, University of Nairobi Chemical Club

 He was a Member of East African Wild Life Society (EAWLS).
 He was a Member of the Institute of Biology of Britain (MIBiol).
 He was a Member of Natural Product Research Network for Eastern and Central Africa(NAPRECA).
 He was a Member of Biochemical Society of Kenya (BSK).
 He was a  Member of Kenya Physiological Society (KPS).
 He was a Member of  International Association for the Study of Medicinal Forest Plants (IAMFP)
 He was a  Member of National Geographic Society, U.S.A.
 He was Member of Biochemical Society of Great Britain.
 He was a Member of South African Society of Biochemistry and Molecular Biology 

 He was a Member of the New York Academy of Sciences.

References 

1955 births
2018 deaths
Kenyan biochemists
Kenyan scientists
People from Kisumu County